Lars-Olof Mattsson (born 13 November 1954) is a Swedish football coach.

Career
Mattsson played for Köla AIK, IFK Arvika, IF Olsfors, Mariestads BK and Torsby IF.

He previously coached clubs in Sweden and Norway, such as Gimo IF, Säffle FF, IK Oddevold, Degerfors IF, Fredrikstad FK, Ljungskile SK, Sweden under-21 team, Västra Frölunda IF, Moss FK, FK Tønsberg and FC Trollhättan.

Mattsson took charge of the Sierra Leone national team in January 2011, and in March of that year publicly expressed a desire to remain in the job once his one-match contract expired. In April 2011, Mattsson's contract was extended until the end of the 2012 Africa Cup of Nations qualifying campaign. However, Mattsson, who was appointed by the Sports Ministry, was not recognised by the Sierra Leone Football Association, until a meeting between the two organisations confirmed Mattsson's role as manager.

Mattsson was awarded a full-time contract in May 2012.

On 28 March 2013, Mattsson quit his job as manager of the Sierra Leone national team, and announced he wanted to take a break from football. However, the Sierra Leone Football Association denied knowledge of the resignation.

References

1954 births
Living people
Swedish footballers
Swedish football managers
Degerfors IF managers
Fredrikstad FK managers
Moss FK managers
Swedish expatriate football managers
Swedish expatriate sportspeople in Norway
Expatriate football managers in Norway
IK Oddevold managers
Expatriate football managers in Sierra Leone
Sierra Leone national football team managers
Ljungskile SK managers
IK Arvika players
Lillestrøm SK non-playing staff
Association footballers not categorized by position